Mayiladumkunnu is a 1972 Indian Malayalam film, directed by S. Babu and produced by Chithrakala Kendram. The film stars Prem Nazir, Jayabharathi, K. P. Ummer, Adoor Bhasi and Muthukulam Raghavan Pillai in the lead roles. The film had musical score by G. Devarajan.

Cast

Prem Nazir as Joy 
Jayabharathi as Lisa
K. P. Ummer as Rajappan
Adoor Bhasi as Mathan
Muthukulam Raghavan Pillai as Rosamma's father 
Sankaradi as Outha
Sreelatha Namboothiri as Eli
T. R. Omana as Rosanna
Adoor Bhavani as Mariya
Khadeeja as Eli's mother 
Paravoor Bharathan as George
Sujatha as Leela
 Master Sekhar
Sobha as Young Lisa

Soundtrack
The music was composed by G. Devarajan and the lyrics were written by Vayalar Ramavarma.

Legacy 
All songs of this movie are still popular.

Lead characters in the 2010 movie Paappi Appacha by Dileep and Innocent pair have a similar lifestyle to the comedians in the "Paappi Appacha" song of this movie.

References

External links
 

1972 films
1970s Malayalam-language films